The National Board of Review Award for Best Animated Feature is one of the annual awards given (since 2000) by the National Board of Review of Motion Pictures. Every year from 2001 to 2004 and from 2007 to 2011 and in 2020 and 2021, the award was given to the film that would eventually receive the Academy Award counterpart.

Winners

2000s

2010s

2020s

Multiple winners (3 or more)
Brad Bird-3
Pete Docter-3

References

National Board of Review Awards
Awards for best animated feature film
American film-related lists
Awards established in 2000
2000 establishments in the United States